Kentucky Route 884 (KY 884) is a south-north highway in Warren County, Kentucky. Primarily a route serving rural areas southeast of Bowling Green, the route enters the city before its end at U.S. Route 231 (US 231, Scottsville Road). The route is known locally as Three Springs Road.

Route description

KY 884 begins at a junction with Kentucky Route 240, in the community of Woodburn. The route proceeds north for  before crossing a railroad track.  The route then continues through rolling farmland for another  before intersecting KY 242. Following this junction, KY 884 continues North for another  before bridging the William H. Natcher Parkway via an overpass. Shortly before this point, the area around the route becomes more residential.

KY 884 then proceeds North for another  before reaching a junction with Smallhouse Road, an important local corridor. Three Springs Park, one of the largest parks in the Bowling Green Parks and Recreation system, is located in the corner of this junction. Following the junction with Smallhouse Road, KY 884 continues north into the city of Bowling Green, before ending at a junction with US 231 in a busy commercial area.

Future
There have been studies done in recent years to consider the benefits of widening KY 884 from the Natcher overpass to its end at US 231. Despite a moderate amount of local support, no plans to expand the route have been put in motion.

Major intersections

References

External links

 Kentucky Route 884 News

0884
Transportation in Warren County, Kentucky